Natick is a town in Massachusetts. 

Natick may also refer to:

Places 
 Natick, Nebraska
 East Natick, Rhode Island

Ships 
 USS Agawam (SP-570), was renamed USS Natick (SP-570) in 1917
 Natick (YTB-760), a tugboat acquired by the U.S. Navy in 1961
 Natick-class tugboat, a class of harbor tugboats that have been active since the 1960s

Other
Natick language, another name for the Massachusett language
Natick Indians, Native American residents of a Praying Town

See also